Oxford is an unincorporated community in Sumter County, Florida, United States. Its ZIP code is 34484.

Geography
Oxford is bordered by Wildwood to the south, rural Sumter County to the west, the Marion County line to the north, and The Villages to the east. It is located  along U.S. 301 and the CSX Wildwood Subdivision, which is part of the CSX S-Line. The main intersections are with County Road 466 and a lesser intersection with County Road 472 exists south of there.

Notes

External links
Oxford, Florida (Florida HomeTown Locator)

Unincorporated communities in Sumter County, Florida
Unincorporated communities in Florida
Former municipalities in Florida